Aspergillus chrysellus is a species of fungus in the genus Aspergillus. It is from the Cremei section. The species was first described in 1965.

Growth and morphology

A. chrysellus has been cultivated on both Czapek yeast extract agar (CYA) plates and Malt Extract Agar Oxoid® (MEAOX) plates. The growth morphology of the colonies can be seen in the pictures below.

References 

chrysellus
Fungi described in 1965